Time Zero is a BBC Books original novel written by Justin Richards and based on the long-running British science fiction television series Doctor Who. It features the Eighth Doctor, Fitz and Anji and introduces a new companion, Trix.

Plot
A story arc about the Multiverse collapsing begins in this novel, ending in Timeless

External links
The Cloister Library - Time Zero

2002 British novels
2002 science fiction novels
Eighth Doctor Adventures
Novels by Justin Richards